The National Union of the Footwear, Leather and Allied Trades (NUFLAT) was a trade union in the United Kingdom which existed between 1971 and 1991. It represented workers in the leather and footwear industry.

History

The union was founded in 1971, with the merger of the Amalgamated Society of Leather Workers, the National Union of Boot and Shoe Operatives, the National Union of Glovers and Leather Workers and the National Union of Leather Workers and Allied Trades.  Although initially a strong union with many closed shop agreements, its membership fell rapidly due to large-scale redundancies in the industry.  In 1991, it merged with the National Union of Hosiery and Knitwear Workers to form the National Union of Knitwear, Footwear and Apparel Trades.  By the time of the merger, membership had fallen to 22,894. After further mergers, this eventually became part of Community.

Election results
The union sponsored a Labour Party candidate in several Parliamentary elections.

Officials

General Presidents
1971: Bert Comerford
1980: Bob Stevenson

General Secretaries
1971: T. A. Moore
1973: Bill Jones
1976: Sid Clapham
1983: Gordon Stewart
1988: George Browett

References

External links
Catalogue of the NUFLAT archives, held at the Modern Records Centre, University of Warwick

Defunct trade unions of the United Kingdom
Trade unions established in 1971
Trade unions disestablished in 1991
Leather industry trade unions
1971 establishments in the United Kingdom
Footwear industry trade unions
Trade unions based in Northamptonshire